George Arthur Brethen (born August 29, 1877 in Norwood, Ontario, Canada-died January 31, 1968) was a Canadian politician and farmer. He was elected to the House of Commons of Canada as a Member of the Progressive Party in the 1921 election to represent the riding of Peterborough East. He was defeated in the 1925 election in the riding of Hastings—Peterborough.

External links
 

1877 births
1968 deaths
Members of the House of Commons of Canada from Ontario
Progressive Party of Canada MPs
Place of death missing